HCIS is a four-letter acronym, and may refer to:
Herbal Cannabis Ignition Source 
Harbor City International School, Duluth, Minnesota, USA
Hwa Chong International School, Singapore